Idama Grama Niladhari Division is a Grama Niladhari Division of the Moratuwa Divisional Secretariat  of Colombo District  of Western Province, Sri Lanka .  It has Grama Niladhari Division Code 552.

St. Sebastian's College, Moratuwa, Prince of Wales' College, Moratuwa and Princess of Wales' College  are located within, nearby or associated with Idama.

Idama is a surrounded by the Horethuduwa North, Rawathawatta West, Kadalana, Moratuwella North, Uyana South and Rawathawatta South  Grama Niladhari Divisions.

Demographics

Ethnicity 

The Idama Grama Niladhari Division has a Sinhalese majority (96.0%) . In comparison, the Moratuwa Divisional Secretariat (which contains the Idama Grama Niladhari Division) has a Sinhalese majority (94.3%)

Religion 

The Idama Grama Niladhari Division has a Buddhist plurality (40.1%), a significant Roman Catholic population (31.8%) and a significant Other Christian population (23.7%) . In comparison, the Moratuwa Divisional Secretariat (which contains the Idama Grama Niladhari Division) has a Buddhist majority (68.2%) and a significant Roman Catholic population (19.8%)

Grama Niladhari Divisions of Moratuwa Divisional Secretariat

References